Mark Lucio Rozzi (born April 30, 1971) is an American businessman and politician who served as the 142nd Speaker of the Pennsylvania House of Representatives from January to February 2023. He currently serves as representative for the 126th district.

Biography
Prior to his first campaign for state representative, Rozzi ran his family’s window and door installation business, which he sold in 2018. Rozzi is divorced and has one daughter.

Rozzi was sexually abused and raped by a priest in the Roman Catholic Church as a child. Making it easier for victims to bring charges and file lawsuits against the accused has been one of his political objectives. On November 26, 2019, Pennsylvania Governor Tom Wolf chose Muhlenberg High School, which is located in Rozzi's home district as the location to sign new legislation which significantly overhauls the child sex abuse statute in Pennsylvania. The new law: abolishes Pennsylvania's criminal statute of limitations on childhood sexual abuse and extends the timeline victims have to file civil action against their abusers; clarifies penalties for failure to report child abuse; makes conversations with law enforcement agents exempt from non-disclosure agreements; and creates a fund for victims of sexual abuse to pay for abuse-related therapy. Rozzi was among those who attended the signing ceremony. However, the amendment would also need to be passed by the next successive legislature in order for the amendment to go to a referendum where voters will decide whether to adopt it. A 2021 clerical error by Wolf's administration caused the final passage of the amendment to be pushed back even further.

In 2023, Rozzi was elected as Speaker of the Pennsylvania House of Representatives, following speculation and disputes over which party controlled the legislature. He was nominated by Republican Representative Jim Gregory as a compromise candidate, earning bipartisan support. Following his election, Rozzi said he would govern as an independent and not caucus with either party. However, according to private conversations with fellow Democrats, Rozzi would not change his party registration. His private comments saying he would remain in the Democratic Party caused controversy with the Republicans who voted him for speaker, including Gregory, who said Rozzi should resign. According to Gregory and others, Rozzi repeatedly told them he would leave the Democratic Party and officially register as an Independent should he be elected speaker.

As Speaker, Rozzi said his first priority would be to finally pass the amendment to Pennsylvania's constitution to allow victims of sexual abuse a two year gap in the statute of limitations for them to sue their abusers. Governor Wolf called a special session of the legislature so such the amendment could be passed the required second time. However, Republicans in the State Senate combined the amendment on sexual abuse survivors with two others to require voter ID and regulatory reform. Rozzi opposed the addition of the two other amendments and called the State House into recess until February 27, 2023 or until a deal to separate the statute of limitations amendment could be reached. He later announced the House would be in session on February 21, where House operating rules were finally put in place after having been non-existent during the session thus far.  Rozzi continued his push for legislation making the sex abuse survivors amendment separate from the other two. He was successful on February 24, with an amendment solely concerning victim relief passing 161-40. However, State Senate Majority Leader Joe Pittman has said the three amendment package previously passed would be the last time the Senate dealt with the issue.

On February 28, Rozzi resigned as Speaker of the House and returned to the Democratic Caucus.

Electoral history

Notes

References

External links
Official page at the Pennsylvania General Assembly
Campaign site
 

|-

1971 births
21st-century American politicians
Businesspeople from Pennsylvania
Democratic Party members of the Pennsylvania House of Representatives
Kutztown University of Pennsylvania alumni
Living people
People from Berks County, Pennsylvania
Pennsylvania Independents
Speakers of the Pennsylvania House of Representatives